Davis Airport  was a general aviation airport located  north of East Lansing, in DeWitt Township, Michigan, United States.

Facilities 
The airport had five hangars at the east end of the airfield.

Runways 
Davis Airport had three runways.

 Runway 9/27: , surface: turf
 Runway 16/34: , surface: turf
 Runway 4/22: , surface: turf

History 
Davis Airport is named after Major Arthur J. Davis, a Lansing aviator during the 1920s and 1930s, who operated Michigan Airways, Inc. from a field in East Lansing and at Capital City Airport.

Davis was an original "barnstorming" pilot prior to the war and a few who had the opportunity to fly with him in his "taper wing" Waco F series biplane in the years following the War cherish those memories.

One of the earliest records of the airport is from the November 1954 Milwaukee Sectional Chart, which then depicted Davis Airport as having a  unpaved runway.

The airport was the home to many local pilots for years. Many pilots learned to fly at the airport under the instruction of Harold D. Coakley, who became a flight instructor upon the close of WWII after serving in the Army Air Corps.

The airport was managed by Dale H. Sheren for many years, who was a close friend of Art Davis.  Sheren managed the airport until his death in 1976.

In January 1992, three man faced five felony charges for larceny, malicious destruction, and breaking into airplanes and a van at the airport.  On August 6, 1992, a small plane skidded past a runway, hit an embankment, and flipped over Chandler Road, landing upside down in a ditch.

In 1999 approximately 20 aircraft were based at the airport.

The airport closed on May 5, 2000, and was developed into apartment buildings.

See also 
 List of airports in Michigan
 Clinton County, Michigan
 DeWitt Charter Township, Michigan
 East Lansing, Michigan

References

External links 
 Aerial photo as of 07 April 1999 from USGS The National Map
  Abandoned & Little-Known Airfields: Southeastern Michigan

Defunct airports in Michigan
Airports in Michigan
Buildings and structures in Clinton County, Michigan
East Lansing, Michigan
Transportation in Lansing, Michigan
2000 disestablishments in Michigan